Iris Zaki is an Israeli film maker. She is best known for her film Unsettling which is a documentary about Zaki (a left wing Israeli) living in the Israeli settlement of Tekoa for two months. An earlier film by Zaki, Women in Sink, received 13 awards and has been screened at over 120 festivals and universities. Zaki teaches ethnographic and documentary filmmaking.

Zaki completed her PhD at Royal Holloway, University of London. She wrote her doctoral dissertation on whether it was possible to film a conversation without creating the feel of an interview. She calls the technique "The Abandoned Camera". While filming Unsettling Zaki says, "It took a long time for people to calm down and feel comfortable with my presence".

References 

21st-century Israeli women
Israeli documentary filmmakers
Year of birth missing (living people)
Alumni of the University of London
Living people